Lindsay Alexander "Alec" Troup (1909 – death unknown) was a Scottish professional rugby league footballer who played in the 1930s.

Background
Alec Troup was born in Orkney, Scotland.

Playing career

International honours
Alec Troup won caps for England while at Barrow in 1934 against Australia, and France, in 1935 against Wales, in 1936 against Wales, and won caps for Great Britain while at Barrow in 1936 against New Zealand (2 matches).

Alec Troup played for Rugby League XIII while at Barrow against France.

Challenge Cup Final appearances
Alec Troup played left-, i.e. number 11, in Barrow's 4–7 defeat by Salford in the 1938 Challenge Cup Final during the 1937–38 season at Wembley on Saturday 7 May 1938.

County Cup Final appearances
Alec Troup played left-, i.e. number 11, in Barrow's 4–8 defeat by Warrington in the 1937 Lancashire County Cup Final during the 1937–38 season at Central Park, Wigan on Saturday 23 October 1937.

Genealogical information
Alec Troup's marriage to Bessie (née Williams) was registered during fourth ¼ 1931 in Barrow in Furness district.

References

External links
(archived by web.archive.org) Trio Inducted Into Barrow RL Hall Of Fame
Search for "Alec Troup" at britishnewspaperarchive.co.uk
Search for "Alex Troup" at britishnewspaperarchive.co.uk
Search for "Alexander Troup" at britishnewspaperarchive.co.uk

1909 births
Barrow Raiders players
England national rugby league team players
Great Britain national rugby league team players
Place of death missing
Rugby league locks
Rugby league players from the Orkney Islands
Rugby League XIII players
Scottish rugby league players
Year of death missing